Miskow Makwarth (5 November 1905 – 13 December 1992) was a Danish film actor. He appeared in 30 films between 1937 and 1976.

Filmography

Provinsen kalder - 1935
Inkognito - 1937
Flådens blå matroser - 1937
Mordets melodi - 1944
Sikken en nat - 1947
Tre år efter - 1948
Som sendt fra himlen - 1951
Bag de røde porte - 1951
Det store løb - 1952
Kongeligt besøg - 1954
Ild og Jord - 1955
Min datter Nelly - 1955
Det var på Rundetårn - 1955
Færgekroen - 1956
Tag til marked i Fjordby - 1957
Natlogi betalt - 1957
Krudt og klunker - 1958
Støv på hjernen - 1961
Sorte Shara - 1961
Tine - 1964
Premiere i helvede - 1964
En ven i bolignøden - 1965
Nyhavns glade gutter - 1967
Dyrlægens plejebørn - 1968
Min søsters børn vælter byen - 1968
Den røde rubin - 1969
Ta' lidt solskin - 1969
Der kom en soldat - 1969
Præriens skrappe drenge - 1970
Tandlæge på sengekanten - 1971
Rektor på sengekanten - 1972
Romantik på sengekanten - 1973
Julefrokosten - 1976

External links

1905 births
1992 deaths
Danish male film actors
People from Svendborg
20th-century Danish male actors